The 2019 San Miguel Corporation – PSA Annual Awards was an annual awarding ceremony recognizing the top athletes, coaches, officials, sports personalities (both living or deceased), National Sports Associations and sports-related organizations for the year 2018, particularly from those who competed in the international tournaments such as the Asian Games, Asian Para Games and Summer Youth Olympics. The awards night is organized by the Philippine Sportswriters Association, the country's oldest media organization founded in 1949. PSA, which is headed by its president, Eduardo "Dodo" Catacutan, Jr. (Sports Interactive Network Philippines - Spin.ph Editor-in-Chief), is an organization of seasoned and young sports editors, columnists and writers from newspapers (broadsheets and tabloids) and online sports websites in the Philippines.

The awards night was held at the Centennial Hall of the Manila Hotel in Manila on February 26, 2019.

Leading the honor roll list of 75 awardees are Weightlifter Hidilyn Diaz, golfers Yuka Saso, Bianca Pagdanganan and Lois Kaye Go and skateboarder Margielyn Didal who received the Athlete of the Year awards. Didal and Saso were abled to attend, while Diaz, Pagdanganan and Go did not graced the awarding due to their current training camps in China and United States of America respectively. Top sports officials led by Philippine Sports Commission (PSC) Chairman Butch Ramirez and Philippine Olympic Committee (POC) officials attended the occasion.

1987 Southeast Asian Games bemedalled gymnast and 1992 Barcelona Olympics bronze medalist for Taekwondo (demonstration sport) Bea Lucero–Lhuillier was served as the guest speaker.

Honor roll

Main awards
The following are the list of main awards of the event.

Athlete of the Year
Five of the country's female athletes from weightlifting, golf and roller sports, who have won 4 gold medals in the recently-concluded 2018 Asian Games last August 18–September 2, 2018 in Jakarta and Palembang, Indonesia were honored as the Athlete of the Year awardees. This is the first time in 9 years that an all-female team will receive the highest award of the PSA Annual Awards.

In March 2010, cue artist Rubilen Amit, long jumper Marestella Torres–Sunang and taekwondo (poomsae) world champion triumvirate of Camille Alarilla, Janice Lagman–Lizardo and Rani Ann Ortega were recognized as the Athletes of the Year. Hidilyn Diaz will receive her 2nd Athlete of the Year award in three consecutive years. Diaz was once recognized by the PSA with the same award in 2017, after winning the silver medal in the 2016 Summer Olympics in Rio de Janeiro, Brazil.

Other major honorees

Major awardees
Sorted in alphabetical order (based on their surnames).

Minor citations
Sorted in alphabetical order (based on their surnames).

Tony Siddayao Awards for Under-17 Athletes
The award, which is named after Tony Siddayao (deceased), former sports editor of Manila Standard is given out to outstanding junior athletes. Sorted in alphabetical order (based on their surnames).

Milo Junior Athletes of the Year
The award, sponsored by Milo, will be given to the two young athletes who are excelled in the field of sports.

Posthumous Awards for Deceased Sports Personalities
This set of awards, will be bestowed upon former national & collegiate athletes, officials and sports personalities who passed away in 2018. They will be given a trophy and a one-minute moment of silence.

See also
2018 in Philippine sports
Philippines at the 2018 Asian Games
Philippines at the 2018 Asian Para Games
Philippines at the 2018 Summer Youth Olympics

References

PSA
PSA